The 1986 Iraqi Perseverance Cup was the 1st edition of the Iraqi Super Cup. The match was contested between the 1985–86 Iraqi National League winners and runners-up respectively, Al-Talaba and Al-Rasheed, at Al-Rasheed Stadium in Baghdad. It was played on 27 February 1986 to bring an end to the 1985–86 season. Al-Rasheed won the game 2–1.

Match

Details

References

External links
 Iraq Football Association

Football competitions in Iraq
1985–86 in Iraqi football
Iraqi Super Cup